Saputo Inc. is a Canadian dairy company based in Montreal, Quebec, founded in 1954 by the Saputo family. It produces, markets, and distributes a wide array of dairy products, including cheese, fluid milk, extended shelf-life milk and cream products, cultured products and dairy ingredients and is one of the top ten dairy processors in the world.

The company has expanded predominantly through mergers and acquisitions. Its products are sold in over 60 countries worldwide, operating in Canada, the United States, Argentina, Australia and the United Kingdom, with about half of its revenues coming from its US operations. It operated in Wales and Germany from 2006 to 2013. It used to own the Canadian rights to Hostess Brands products.

History 

Master cheesemaker Giuseppe Saputo, his son Lino Saputo and family immigrated to Montreal from Montelepre, Italy, in the early 1950s. In September 1954, Lino convinced his father to start his own business. Using $500 to buy some basic equipment and a bicycle for deliveries, the Saputo family founded a cheesemaking company bearing its name. In 1957, Saputo's first sizable production facility was built in Montreal's Saint-Michel neighbourhood. Saputo went through considerable growth in the 1960s and 1970s as demand for its products increased. It became Canada's largest producer of mozzarella in the 1980s.

In 1988, Saputo expanded to the United States by acquiring two cheese plants. In the 1990s, the company made several acquisitions to diversify its product offering and geographic reach. In 1997, it became a publicly traded company and tripled in size following the acquisition of Stella Foods in the US.

In 2001, Saputo acquired Dairyworld Foods, the production and marketing arm of Agrifoods International Cooperative Ltd, which included the Dairyland milk and Armstrong cheese brands, for C$407 million. Agrifoods International was itself the result of a series of mergers between dairy cooperatives in Western Canada in the 1990s. Armstrong Cheese was formerly an independent cheese maker in Armstrong, British Columbia, which was acquired by Dairyworld in 1997. After Saputo obtained the brand, it closed the plant in Armstrong.

In 2003, the firm continued to acquire businesses in the US and expanded into Argentina with the acquisition of Molfino Hermanos S.A. That same year, while remaining chairman of the board Lino Saputo stepped down as president and CEO and was succeeded in this role by his son, Lino A. Saputo. In 2008, Saputo acquired Neilson Dairy from George Weston Limited for C$465 million. The firm announced in 2012 it would buy Morningstar Food for US$1.45 billion. In January 2014, Saputo announced that they would be purchasing the fluid milk business of Scotsburn Co-operative Services Limited of Nova Scotia for $61 million. In February 2014, Saputo acquired a relevant interest of 87.920 percent of Victoria, Australia, dairy product firm Warrnambool Cheese & Butter Factory Company Holdings Limited shares. It acquired all the remaining shares in March 2017.

On February 3, 2015, Canada Bread Company Limited completed a C$120 million acquisition of Saputo Bakery, a division of Saputo Inc. Canada Bread Company Limited is a subsidiary of Mexico's Grupo Bimbo.

In September 2017, Saputo announced complete acquisition of the Extended Shelf-Life Dairy Product Activities of Southeast Milk, Inc. in the United States. In November 2017, According to the reports, Saputo acquired Betin Inc. a Belmont specialty cheese maker with a facility that employs 319 workers.

On February 22, 2019, it was announced that Saputo would be buying British dairy company, Dairy Crest. The company was valued at C$1.7 billion (£975 million). The transaction was completed on April 15, 2019.

Main shareholders 

At February 10, 2022

Statistics 

 Revenues: 14,3 billion CAD as at March 31, 2021
 Employees: Approximately 18 000 as at February 10, 2022
 Facilities: 67 (18 in Canada, 29 in the US, 13 international and 7 in Europe as at March 31, 2021

Brands 

Brands by Saputo include: Saputo, Alexis de Portneuf, Armstrong, Cathedral City, Cheer, Clover, Cracker Barrel (trademark used under licence), Dairyland, DairyStar, Devondale, Friendship Dairies, Frigo, Frigo Cheese Heads, Frylight, Joyya La Paulina, Milk2Go, Montchevre, Murray Goulburn Ingredients, Neilson, Nutrilait, Salemville, Scotsburn (trademark used under license), Sheese, South Cape, Stella, Sungold,  Tasmanian Heritage, Treasure Cave, Woolwich Dairy and Yorkshire Wensleydale

Divisions 

 Dairy Division (Canada)
 Dairy Division (USA)
 Dairy Division (Argentina)
 Dairy Division (Australia)
 Dairy Division (UK)

See also 

 List of dairy product companies in the United States

References

External links 

 

Companies listed on the Toronto Stock Exchange
Food and drink companies established in 1954
Manufacturing companies based in Montreal
Dairy products companies of Canada
S&P/TSX 60
1954 establishments in Quebec
Canadian companies established in 1954
Canadian brands
Family-owned companies of Canada